Edmonton Airports, officially the Edmonton Regional Airports Authority, was formed in 1990, under the Regional Airports Authorities Act passed by the Legislative Assembly of Alberta in 1989, and is responsible for the management and operation of two airports in the Edmonton area. It is a non-profit organisation and, as per the act, has no shareholders and does not pay dividends.

The authority is governed by a 15-member board of directors appointed to represent the various municipalities and the Government of Canada (2 members). These municipalities include the cities of Edmonton (six members), Leduc (one member), Leduc County (one member), Parkland County (one member), Strathcona County (one member) and Sturgeon County (one member). The board also appoints two members at-large.

Operations 
Edmonton Airports operates the Edmonton International Airport (EIA) and the Edmonton/Villeneuve Airport. The EIA is owned by Transport Canada, leased by Edmonton Airports, and part of the National Airports System. It includes a planned inland port logistics support facility in support of the Port Alberta initiative. The Villeneuve Airport is owned by Edmonton Airports.

See also 
 Greater Toronto Airports Authority and Toronto Port Authority
 Regina Airport Authority
 Vancouver Airport Services
 Halifax International Airport Authority

References 

 
Companies based in Edmonton
Airport operators of Canada
1990 establishments in Alberta
Transport companies established in 1990
Government-owned companies of Canada
Non-profit corporations